Thulasendrapuram or Thulasendirapuram is a village in Tiruvarur district, Tamil Nadu, India. It is about 7 km from Mannargudi and 35 km from Thiruvarur. In 2020, its population was approximately 350.

Places 
 Sri Santana Mariamman Kovil (Temple)
 Sri Sevaga Perumal Kovil (Temple)
 Sri Dharmasasta Temple
 Sri Vallabha Mahaganapathi (Temple)
 Thamarai Kulam (Lake)

Notable people
 P. V. Gopalan, maternal grandfather of Kamala Harris, the US Vice President

References 

Villages in Tiruvarur district
Tourism in Tamil Nadu